Schneehübel (literally translated: snow hill) is a mountain within the western part of the mountain range Erzgebirge in the German Free State of Saxony. Concurrently, the Schneehübel is the highest mountain of the Vogtland region.

Mountains of Saxony
Mountains of the Ore Mountains